Tooheys Old is a dark ale produced in Australia by Tooheys. It has been brewed since 1869 and Tooheys began bottling it in 1970. It has 4.4% alcohol per volume and contains 132 calories. 
It is on tap in many bars in New South Wales, Australian Capital Territory, South Australia and Queensland. It is made with top fermentation ale yeast, lightly hopped with black malt giving it a very dark, almost blackish, colour. 

The beer was formerly known as Tooheys Hunter Old Ale.  

It is one of only two Australian mass-produced beers to earn a mention in The Great Beer Guide  along with Dogbolter.

See also

Australian pub
Beer in Australia
List of breweries in Australia

References

External links
Tooheys - Lion Nathan
Australian beers
backpacker net
Tuoppi
Australian food

Kirin Group
Australian beer brands